The Colby Mules women's ice hockey program represents Colby College. The team used to compete in the ECAC. Currently, the club is a member of the New England Small College Athletic Conference (NESCAC). The Mules were one of only two non-Division I schools at the time in the 12-team Eastern Collegiate Athletic Conference.

Players
During the 1995-96 season, Meaghan Sittler led the NCAA with 41 goals and 40 assists in 21 games. In her final 13 games, Sittler had eight hat tricks and either scored or assisted on 82 of 111 White Mules goals.

Coaches
Laura Halldorson led the Mules to a 12-9-1 overall record in 1995-96. In the process, she earned ECAC Co-Coach of the Year honors as well as being named the New England Hockey Writers’ Coach of the Year. While at Colby, she recruited and coached U.S. National Team members Meaghan Sittler and Barb Gordon. Following two seasons as an assistant at Princeton, she took over at Colby, where she spent seven seasons building a program that turned a 5-12-2 record in her first season into a 12-9-1 mark in her last season.

Postseason

ECAC Tournament
1988
FIRST ROUND, New Hampshire 4, Colby 0
1996
QUARTERFINALS AT HIGHER SEEDS, No. 1 Brown 7, No. 8 Colby 2
1997
QUARTERFINALS, No. 1 Brown 6, No. 8 Colby 2

Awards and honors
Laura Halldorson, ECAC Co-Coach of the Year honors
Laura Halldorson, New England Hockey Writers’ Coach of the Year.
Courtney Kennedy, 1998 American Women's College Hockey Alliance All-Americans
Meaghan Sittler, 1998 American Women's College Hockey Alliance All-Americans
Meaghan Sittler, 1998 Top 10 Finalist, Patty Kazmaier Award

References

External links 

Ice Hockey, Women
Ice hockey teams in Maine
College women's ice hockey teams in the United States
Former ECAC Hockey teams
Women's sports in Maine